Stenomorpha is a genus of darkling beetles in the family Tenebrionidae. There are more than 160 described species/subspecies in Stenomorpha.

See also
 List of Stenomorpha species

References

External links

 

Pimeliinae